Kyu Sakamoto Memorial Best is an album by Kyu Sakamoto released in 2005 by EMI in the UK. The songs are the best known of Sakamoto's career.

Track listing
 Miagete goran yoru no hoshi wo
 Sukiyaki
 Ashita Ga Arusa
 Kanashiki 60sai
 Good Timing
 Kyu-Chan Zuntatta
 Kyu-Chan Ondo
 Boku No Hoshi (My Star)
 Hitoribocchi No Futari (The Lonesome Two)
 Tokyo Gorin Ondo
 Shiawasenara Tewotatako
 Sayuonara Tokyo
 Yoakeno Uta
 Tomodachi
 Namidakun Sayuonara
 Lets Kiss (Jenka)
 Sekaino Kunikara Konnichiwa
 Otonano Douwa Imadakara Iukeredo
 Kokorono Hitomi
 China Night

2005 compilation albums
Kyu Sakamoto albums